Kavalur is a village in the Jawadhu Hills in Vaniyambadi taluk, Tamil Nadu, India. The village hosts the Vainu Bappu Observatory (VBO), which was established in the 1970s, and contains the  Carl Zeiss Telescope, and the  Vainu Bappu telescope.

Demographics
 census, Kavalur had a total population of 1010 with 496 males and 514 females. The sex ratio was 1036. The literacy rate was 48.45.

See also
Vainu Bappu Observatory
Vellore
Vainu Bappu
Jawadhu Hills

References

Further reading

External links
 Vellore district
 Indian Institute of Astrophysics

Villages in Tirupathur district